A resort municipality is a type of municipal status in the Canadian provinces of British Columbia and Prince Edward Island. British Columbia also has a related municipal status type of mountain resort municipality.

The lone resort municipality in British Columbia is Whistler, which was created by the Resort Municipality of Whistler Act. In Prince Edward Island, the Resort Municipality of Stanley Bridge, Hope River, Bayview, Cavendish and North Rustico was established as a resort municipality in 1990. The Government of Prince Edward Island's Municipal Government Act prevents the incorporation of any new resort municipalities.

See also 
 List of municipalities in British Columbia
 List of municipalities in Prince Edward Island
 List of resort villages in Saskatchewan
 List of summer villages in Alberta
 Mountain resort municipalities:
 Jumbo Glacier, British Columbia
 Sun Peaks, British Columbia
 Municipal government in Canada
 Resort town

References 

Census divisions of Canada

Local government in Canada
Municipalities
Subdivisions of Canada